Bluewaters Island is an artificial island  off the Jumeirah Beach Residence coastline, near Dubai Marina, in Dubai, United Arab Emirates.

The project was approved by Mohammed bin Rashid Al Maktoum, Vice President and Prime Minister of the UAE and Ruler of Dubai, and unveiled on February 13, 2013. It is built on reclaimed land by Meraas Holding, with dredging work conducted by Van Oord, the Dutch firm known for its work on Palm Jumeirah, at an estimated cost AED 6 billion (1.6 billion USD, including the Ain Dubai, formerly the Dubai Eye). Construction was originally due to start in April 2013, but actually began on May 20, 2013. It opened in November 2018.

The island includes entertainment, hospitality, residential, and retail zones, and is forecast to attract more than three million visitors annually.

The island features two five-star hotels with direct beach access. Bluewaters also has around 200 beverage and retail and food outlets in the ground level of residential buildings and entertainment section of the island. The total number of residential buildings on the island is 10. Each of these is considered mid-rise and features 15 storeys or fewer.

Ain Dubai

When completed, it will be  taller than the current world's tallest Ferris wheel, the  High Roller, which opened in Las Vegas in March 2014, and  taller than the  New York Wheel planned for Staten Island.

Design and construction are being undertaken by Hyundai Contracting and Starneth Engineering. Construction started in May 2015.

The wheel will be able to carry up to 1,400 passengers, in its 48 capsules, and provide views of Dubai Marina and landmarks such as Burj Al Arab, Palm Jumeirah. Its base will serve as an entertainment zone, and an  LED screen will be mounted on the wheel creating an electronic platform for broadcasting, advertisements, and other information. The first passenger capsule was installed on August 21, 2020.

References

External links
 Bluewaters official website
 Meraas Development – Bluewaters
 Dubai's Meraas eyes $234 mln loan for Ferris wheel scheme
 London Eye firms in $45.6m legal battle over Dubai Ferris wheel project
 The Ain Dubai observation wheel has come full circle
 Luxurious Waterfront Living At Bluewaters Island
 Luxurious Apartments in Bluewaters Dubai

2013 establishments in the United Arab Emirates
Artificial islands of Dubai
Dubai Marina